Austin Bingley Claypool (April 13, 1887 – June 4, 1956) was a provincial politician from Alberta, Canada. He served as a member of the Legislative Assembly of Alberta from 1921 to 1935 sitting with the United Farmers caucus in government.

Political career
Claypool ran for a seat to the Alberta Legislature for the first time in the 1921 Alberta general election. He ran as a United Farmers candidate in the electoral district of Didsbury. Claypool defeated Liberal candidate George Webber with a comfortable majority to win the two-way race.

Claypool ran for a second term in the 1926 Alberta general election. The race was contested by three candidates. Claypool won a large majority despite losing some of his popular vote from 1921.

The 1930 Alberta general election would see Claypool stand for his third term. He ran in a two-way race against Independent W.A. Austin and beat him by less than 300 votes to hold his seat.

Claypool ran for a fourth term in the 1935 Alberta general election but was defeated in the four-way race finishing a distant second place to Social Credit candidate Edward Foster.

Claypool made a bid to run for a seat to the House of Commons of Canada in the 1940 federal election. He ran in a five-way race as a Liberal candidate but was defeated finishing a close second to incumbent Charles Johnston.

Claypool died in an automobile crash near his hometown of Muncie, Indiana in 1956.

References

External links
Legislative Assembly of Alberta Members Listing

United Farmers of Alberta MLAs
Candidates in the 1940 Canadian federal election
1887 births
1956 deaths
People from Muncie, Indiana
American emigrants to Canada
Liberal Party of Canada candidates for the Canadian House of Commons
Road incident deaths in Indiana